"Games" is the fourth episode of the first season of seaQuest DSV. It originally aired on October 3, 1993.

Plot synopsis 

The seaQuest evacuates an icy prison whose population consists of a warden and his lone prisoner, the biochemist and war criminal Dr. Rubin Zellar. Zellar is (supposedly) being kept cryogenically frozen during transport, while the warden is shown around the ship and begins to get along with Dr. Westphalen.

Crew members soon discover that the body in the stasis chamber is the warden, who was killed by Dr. Zellar. Zellar is captured easily, but escapes and holds the crew hostage with a biological agent he smuggled aboard. He threatens to release the agent unless Captain Bridger and Commander Ford destroy the UEO headquarters at Pearl Harbor.

Meanwhile, Lucas Wolenczak has been trying to access the UEO's files on Zellar, at the request of Bridger. He discovers that Dr. Westphalen's brother was among the many people murdered by Zellar. Bridger and Ford fire the missiles, but since they had removed the warheads earlier, no damage was done. Before they can arrest Zellar, Westphalen walks in, pointing a weapon at Zellar. After exchanging a few words with Zellar she pulls out a vial filled with a liquid and tells him that he deserves to die in the same way that he killed. She throws it on him, but it turns out the liquid was non-toxic.

Afterwards, Zellar is successfully transferred to a new prison in the Sahara.

Background
This was the first episode filmed after the pilot, but aired fourth. This is one of actress Stephanie Beacham's favorite episodes as well as Mark Fauser, who played Lieutenant Phillips. One plot error is that Dr. Westphalen's brother's name was "James Westphalen", which means that "Westphalen" is her maiden name. This contradicts the show's writers' bible since her husband was listed as "Nelson Westphalen", although he never appeared on the show. Recurring character Dr. Joshua Levin (portrayed by Timothy Omundson) made his first appearance in this episode.

References

1993 American television episodes
SeaQuest DSV episodes
Fiction set in 2018